Datuk Jonathan bin Yasin is a Malaysian politician who has served as the Member of Parliament (MP) for Ranau since May 2018. He served as the Deputy Minister of Home Affairs II for the second term in the Barisan Nasional (BN) administration under former Prime Minister Ismail Sabri Yaakob and former Minister Hamzah Zainuddin from August 2021 to the collapse of the BN administration in November 2022 and the first term in  Perikatan Nasional (PN) administration under former Prime Minister Muhyiddin Yassin and former Minister Hamzah from March 2020 to the collapse of the PN administration in August 2021. He is a direct member of the Gabungan Rakyat Sabah (GRS) coalition. He joined the Malaysian United Indigenous Party (BERSATU), a component party of the PN coalition after resigning from the People's Justice Party (PKR), a component party of the Pakatan Harapan (PH) opposition coalition. He later resigned from BERSATU but remained  in GRS as direct member.

Political career

2008 general election 
In the 2008 election, Jonathan under his party of People's Justice Party (PKR) faced Siringan Gubat of the United Pasokmomogun Kadazandusun Murut Organisation (UPKO) and lost in a large majority.

2013 general election 
In the 2013 election, Jonathan faced a new candidate Ewon Ebin of UPKO but losing again the parliamentary seat.

2018 general election 
In the 2018 election, his party of PKR field him to contest the Ranau parliamentary seat again, facing the seat defending candidate Ewon Ebin from UPKO and subsequently won.

Election results

Incident 
In 2013, Jonathan as a PKR member post a picture of Anwar Ibrahim being awarded the "Huguan Siou" (Paramount Leader of the Kadazan-Dusuns) in his Facebook account. This subsequently leading to furore among Kadazan-Dusun community in Sabah as the title is "sacred" and should only be used among the ethnic indigenous community, not for a country title. The Kadazandusun Cultural Association (KDCA) also demanded apologies from him and Anwar. Responding to the criticism, Jonathan said "Who am I to stop any Kadazan-Dusun individual from enthroning any person as 'Huguan Siou' Malaysia?". Anwar however denied that he was bestowed the honour.

Honours 
 :
  Commander of the Order of Kinabalu (PGDK) – Datuk (2021)

References 

Living people
People from Sabah
Members of the Dewan Rakyat
Former People's Justice Party (Malaysia) politicians
Malaysian United Indigenous Party politicians
Date of birth missing (living people)
1967 births
Commanders of the Order of Kinabalu